Maestro (from the Italian maestro , meaning "master" or "teacher") is an honorific title of respect (plural: maestros or maestri). The term is most commonly used in the context of Western classical music and opera, in line with the ubiquitous use of Italian musical terms.

In music
The word maestro is most often used in addressing or referring to conductors. Less frequently, one might refer to respected composers, performers, impresarios, musicologists, and music teachers.

In the world of Italian opera, the title is also used to designate a number of positions within the orchestra and company that have specific duties during rehearsal and performance. These include:
 Maestro sostituto or maestro collaboratore: musicians who act as répétiteurs and assistant conductors during performances.
 Maestro concertatore, the keyboard continuo player, who prepares singers and leads rehearsals.
 Maestro direttore: the leader of the first violins of the orchestra (see concertmaster), who may also have administrative duties such as hiring and paying musicians
 Maestro suggeritore: the prompter

See also
 Pandit
 Ustad

References

Further reading
 
Kennedy, Michael (2006), The Oxford Dictionary of Music, 985 pages, 
 

Italian opera terminology